The 2010 World Snowshoe Championships was the 3rd edition of the global snowshoe running competition, World Snowshoe Championships, organised by the World Snowshoe Federation and took place in Vancouver, Dachstein Glacier on 27 February 2010.

Results
The race World Snowshoe Invitational (dispute during Vancouver 2010 Winter Olympics), held on the distance of 10 km, has compiled two different ranking (male and female) overall, it was the mass start system.

Men's overall

Women's overall

References

External links
 World Snowshoe Federation official web site

World Snowshoe Championships